Lavanya Nalli is an Indian businesswoman. She is vice-chairman of her family's business, the Nalli Group of Companies, which manufactures saris.

Education 
Nalli has an engineering degree in computer science at Anna University in Chennai She is a graduate from Harvard Business School.

Career
After graduation, Nalli moved to Chicago and took a job with McKinsey & Company from 2011 to 2013.

In 2014 Nalli returned to India and joined Myntra.com where she was vice president for revenue and shopping experience.

References 

Living people
Anna University alumni
Harvard Business School alumni
Indian women business executives
McKinsey & Company people
Year of birth missing (living people)